What We Wanted is a 2020 Austrian drama film directed by Ulrike Kofler, in her feature directorial debut, based on the short story Der Lauf der Dinge by Peter Stamm. It was selected as the Austrian entry for the Best International Feature Film at the 93rd Academy Awards, but it was not nominated.

The film was originally set to premiere at the Gartenbaukino in Vienna on 2 November 2020, followed by a theatrical release in Austria on 6 November 2020, but it was delayed due to the COVID-19 pandemic. What We Wanted was ultimately released on Netflix outside Austria on 11 November 2020 and in Austria on 22 December 2020. The film was well received by critics.

Plot
A couple who have been trying for a baby take a holiday to Sardinia, where they meet another couple.

Cast
 Lavinia Wilson as Alice
 Elyas M'Barek as Niklas
 Anna Unterberger as Christl
  as Romed
  as Denise
 Fedor Teyml as David
 Marta Manduca as Sabrina

See also
 List of submissions to the 93rd Academy Awards for Best International Feature Film
 List of Austrian submissions for the Academy Award for Best International Feature Film

References

External links
 

2020 films
2020 directorial debut films
2020 drama films
Austrian drama films
Films about couples
Films about vacationing
Films based on short fiction
Films not released in theaters due to the COVID-19 pandemic
Films set in Sardinia
2020s German-language films